Merchiston is an area of Edinburgh in Scotland.

Merchiston may also refer to:
 Merchiston Tower (or Merchiston Castle), a 15th-century tower now part of Edinburgh Napier University campus
 Merchiston Castle School, a private school in Edinburgh often referred to simply as "Merchiston"
 Merchiston International School, a private international school in Shenzhen, China, an overseas campus of Merchiston Castle School
 Merchiston Preparatory School, a boys' preparatory school in Pietermaritzburg, South Africa, inspired by the Edinburgh school
 Merchiston railway station, a former railway station in the Merchiston area of Edinburgh
 Merchiston Park, a former football ground in Falkirk, home of East Stirlingshire F.C.
 Merchiston, Nebraska, a community in the United States